The Mines Advisory Group (MAG) is a non-governmental organization that assists people affected by landmines, unexploded ordnance, and small arms and light weapons.

MAG takes a humanitarian approach to landmine action. They focus on the impact of their work on local communities. This approach recognises that although the number of landmines in an area may be small, the effect on a community can be crippling. Targets are therefore determined locally, in response to liaison with affected communities, and local authorities.

MAG field operations are managed and implemented by nationals of the affected countries, with MAG expatriate staff taking a monitoring and training role. MAG provides work for many members of affected communities, with families of landmine victims taking an active role.

MAG is based in Manchester, United Kingdom, and has a sister organisation, MAG America in Washington, D.C., United States. As part of the International Campaign to Ban Landmines, MAG was co-laureate of the 1997 Nobel Peace Prize.

History 

MAG was formed in 1989 by Rae McGrath in response to landmines and unexploded ordnance (UXO) left by the Soviet–Afghan War.  The organisation initially served as an advisory group, publishing reports about the problems in Afghanistan and Cambodia based on their assessments between 1989 and 1991. Subsequent reports included Iraq, Somaliland and Angola. In 1992, MAG, along with other NGOs, formed the International Campaign to Ban Landmines (ICBL).

By 1992, MAG had raised sufficient funds to begin its first landmine clearance program in Iraq. Clearance programmes extended to Cambodia the same year, followed by Laos and Angola in 1994. MAG also introduced mine risk education (MRE) alongside their clearance programs to help minimise the risk to the local populations. MRE operations were extended to Rwanda and to refugee camps in Zaire and the former Zambia. In 1996, Lou McGrath became executive director and MAG established its international headquarters in Manchester, United Kingdom.

Mine action techniques

Mine action teams (MATs) 
MAG’s delivery of Humanitarian Mine Action (HMA) is centred on the use of multi-skilled, highly mobile and flexible teams called MATs. These were developed by MAG in the mid-nineties in response to the varied needs of mine affected communities. Drawing on multi-skilled staff, MATs are able to quickly adapt to the many challenges presented not only by mines and unexploded ordnance (UXO), but also to changing environments, including weather, geographical and topographical conditions and the wider security and political climate. Drawing on many years of operational experience, MATs have proven highly successful in countries such as Iraq and Cambodia in delivering a comprehensive and flexible HMA response, with multi-skilling a central aspect of their success. Team members are trained in Community Liaison (CL), information/data gathering, survey and assessment, mapping, logistics, minefield marking, landmine clearance and ordnance disposal (EOD).

Survey and demarcation 
MAG has successfully implemented national socio-economic Landmine Impact Surveys (LIS) which have consequently been  published and widely distributed to mine action operators and other relevant stakeholders. MAG conducted its first emergency survey in Afghanistan in 1989 and conducted the first ever surveys in Cambodia and northern Iraq. Between 1992 and 1997, MAG Iraq conducted one of the largest minefield demarcation programmes in the world, while in Kosovo, MAG was tasked by the UN Mine Action Coordination Centre (MACC) in October 1999 to conduct a Level 2 survey along the border area with Albania. In 1993, MAG conducted an emergency impact assessment of the landmine problem in Moxico province, Angola, which led to the establishment of a MAG clearance programme later that year.

Mechanical 
Mechanical capacities have formed an important element of MAG’s HMA toolbox for several years. Machines have been used successfully to support manual clearance operations in a number of countries, including Angola, Cambodia, Kosovo, Iraq, Lebanon, Sri Lanka and Vietnam. MAG uses a variety of flails, heavy plant and adapted agricultural and quarrying equipment in its programmes.  Current mechanical assets include the Tempest flail, Bozena 4 flail, Armtrac 100 flail, Minecat 230 flail and Digger D-2 flail.  These assets can be used for a variety of tasks, including clearance of land, area reduction, and quality assurance tasks in support of manual clearance operations.

Explosive ordnance disposal (EOD) 
The hazard posed by explosive ordnance is often highly significant in post-conflict situations. A large percentage of ordnance fails to detonate as designed and poses an immediate threat to people trying to rebuild their lives in the aftermath of conflict.  MAG’s EOD response in countries such as Laos includes categorisation; safe handling/moving of ordnance; and destruction of items such as grenades, mortars, shells, cluster bomb sub-munitions, small arms and light weapons and large air dropped bombs. MAG's flexible and multi-skilled approach to HMA means that it is well equipped to operate successfully in countries such as Laos and Vietnam where the explosive contamination is mainly UXO as opposed to landmines.

Mine detection dogs (MDDs) 

MAG has used MDDs in support of its manual and mechanical clearance operations in a number of its programmes, including, northern Iraq, Cambodia and Lebanon. MAG technical staff have extensive experience of managing dog teams and/or integrating MDDs with manual and mechanical clearance operations. In particular, MDDs have proven a highly effective Quality Assurance tool for verification of manual/mechanical clearance sites. Rather than develop its own potentially expensive MDD capacity MAG works with local and international partners, such as CMAC in Cambodia and NPA in Lebanon who have existing dog capacities, to provide the required services.

Mine risk education (MRE) 
MAG has developed the concept of MRE as a form of public health education. MRE offers people knowledge and alternatives for living and working safely in mine/UXO contaminated areas. MRE comprises a number of components that can be adapted to the needs of the target audience. Considerations include: the degree of impact of mines and UXO; economic pressures on affected communities; age; gender; culture; previous exposure to MRE messages; and the resources available to disseminate messages, such as local media, radio, television broadcasts and national networks such as schools, ministries and other institutions.

Community liaison (CL) 
MAG pioneered the use of CL to ensure continual linkage with affected communities throughout the process of programme design, implementation and measurement of impact. 
This inclusive and community focused approach enables a relevant response whilst at the same time fostering high levels of community involvement. MAG’s CL Advisors also interact with relevant agencies, local authorities, HMA coordination bodies and other key stakeholders. CL consists of three main elements:
 Information/data gathering—to prioritise action according to need and impact and to allow for effective task planning
 Information sharing, networking, and ongoing contact with all stakeholders—to ensure that negotiation and planning occur regularly, to periodically review programme effectiveness, and to provide information about mine clearance activities
 Evaluation and impact monitoring—to measure the success of activities, and determine how the programme has impacted on the lives of the local community and what changes have resulted. This learning process enables MAG to improve/refine its approaches and activities at community, national and international levels

SALW 
A protracted series of armed conflicts have resulted in the presence of large numbers of SALW in unsafe conditions in many post-conflict countries; and this constitutes a constant risk not only to life and limb for the local population but also to the current peaceful transition process in the country. MAG removes and destroys unsecured and abandoned SALW caches and by doing so removes the threat posed by unsecured SALW. MAG conducts nationwide surveys of arms deposits and warehouses, puts in place specialist equipment and training of national staff to carry out the cache destruction activities, and provides advice for the safe storage and control of remaining items. MAG first became involved in the destruction of SALW by providing technical support to demobilisation programmes in Angola and Cambodia during the 1990s. More recently, the scale of the problem has become more apparent in the course of MAG's mine and UXO clearance activities in countries such as Iraq, Sudan and DRC and items have been removed or destroyed which are outside the limited scope of the Mine Ban Treaty but which qualify for SALW status and contribute to humanitarian impacts and the proliferation of conflict.

Local capacity development 
As part of its mission to build local HMA capacities, MAG employs local technical and administrative staff wherever possible. In many of the countries it operates, including Angola, Cambodia and Iraq, MAG employs ex-combatants. A facet of this work contributes to the vital demobilisation and reintegration (DDR) of ex-combatants into post-conflict society. Stable employment with MAG allows ex-combatants and their families to adapt, economically and socially, to a productive, civilian life.

Current operations 
MAG has worked in approximately 68 countries since 1989, moving into current and former conflict zones to clear the remnants of those conflicts.

Angola 
MAG has worked in Angola since 1994, with the organisation’s current area of operations, Moxico Province, greatly affected by fighting. The region was the birthplace and once the relative stronghold of rebel leader Jonas Savimbi and his National Union for the Total Independence of Angola (UNITA). Though the 27-year civil war ended in April 2002, the legacy of the conflict continues to affect the population.

Angola is generally considered to have about two landmines for every single person, with 2.4 million people affected daily. The Landmine Impact Survey there identified 1,968 communities, in all 18 of the country's provinces, as being impacted by landmines.

MAG’s Angola programme has approximately 180 Angolan staff, six international (non-Angolan) staff, five Mine Action Teams, one Rapid Response Team, one Road Ops Team, three Community Liaison Teams, two Mechanical Operations Units, consisting of five machines, and one Impact Assessment Team.

Bosnia & Herzegovina 
MAG’s overarching objective in Bosnia and Herzegovina is to support national efforts to reduce the impact of landmines and other items of unexploded ordnance (UXO) on communities. MAG’s mine action programme in the country was established during late 2016 – early 2017, with full operations ongoing since 15 May 2017. The permanent programme builds on a six-month emergency intervention following extensive flooding in 2014, which raised concerns about the movement of landmines. MAG’s current capacity consists of seven Mine Action Teams, two Mine Detection Dog teams and one Community Liaison Team.

Cambodia 

MAG has been operational in Cambodia since 1992 and now employs approximately 475 staff members, working across six provinces: Battambang, Krong Pailin, Banteay Meanchey, Preah Vihear, Kampong Thom and Kampong Cham. Around 34 per cent are female and 9 per cent are amputees who are provided with metal-free prostheses by the International Committee of the Red Cross. There are currently 21 MATs (Mine Action Teams), 5 EOD (Explosive Ordnance Disposal) Teams, 8 CL (Community Liaison) Teams, 1 Technical Survey Team; 4 Research and Development Teams (evaluating new technologies), 6 Mapping Teams, 9 Mechanical Support Teams, 3 scrub-cutting teams and 3 Mine Detection Dog Teams (sub-contracted from the Cambodian Mine Action Centre).

Partnerships and Coordination 
MAG's operations in Cambodia are conducted in association with The Cambodian Mine Action Authority, provincial mine planning units and other operators. At present, MAG works in partnership with many international bodies including CARE, World Vision, Church World Service (CWS) and the Lutheran World Federation (LWF). These partnerships ensure high levels of coordination in developing cleared land in the best way possible for local communities.

MAG Cambodia has developed the locality demining approach; a more efficient and effective way of demining, recruiting deminers from the very communities that are mined. Working alongside development agencies, women and men are recruited from the most vulnerable households and trained in the fundamental skills of demining. Once trained, these teams then work under the supervision of more experienced staff. This approach enables poor families to gain meaningful employment and has resulted in productivity rise whilst still maintaining MAG's excellent safety record.

MAG Cambodia has a well-developed Quality Management system, with the programme being accredited and quality assured by the Cambodian Mine Action Authority (CMAA). In 2003, MAG achieved a 50 per cent increase in output by introducing improved working methods and more mechanical scrub-cutting assets. In 2004 the introduction of small EOD teams in some areas reduced ordnance-related casualties by 50%.

Chad 
After working on landmine, unexploded ordnance and abandoned ordnance clearance, and a project to restore access to safe water from 2004–2007, MAG restarted work in Chad in May 2008 clearing explosive hazards in central, eastern and southern parts of the country. This contamination mainly originates from fighting in recent years between the Chad National Army and various rebel groups. Two mobile destruction teams are conducting technical surveys, identifying clearance requirements and carrying out clearance and demarcation activities. In 2009 MAG also started clearance operations in the north of the country.

Partnerships and Coordination

MAG has a close partnership with the Haut Commission National de Déminage (HCND), the National Chad Demining Office, and work with them when carrying out activities.
MAG has established a good cooperation with HCND over the years and has provided substantial training to HCND Demining / EOD staff in order to enable HCND to mount and implement its own clearance activities.

Democratic Republic of Congo (DRC) 
MAG has been operational in the Democratic Republic of Congo (DRC) since July 2004, working to reduce the threat posed by landmines and unexploded ordnance (UXO)-clearing dangerous areas and using Mine Risk Education (MRE) to create safe access to water sources, agricultural land, medical facilities and education centres as well as destroying stockpiles of small arms and light weapons and ammunition. In the south eastern province of Katanga province and the north western province of Equateur, MAG has trained national staff in Community Liaison and clearance activities, creating seven teams (3 CL and 4 explosive ordnance disposal-trained). These teams work in contaminated areas where large numbers of returnees are expected over the coming years.

During 2007, MAG teams provided Mine Risk Education for more than 263,000 people and cleared more than 243,000 square metres of land, destroying over 83,000 dangerous items in the process.

In September 2006, a large scale Small Arms and Light Weapons (SALW) project was implemented, responsible for the safe destruction of surplus munitions and weapons nationwide, and a direct contribution to peace building in DRC and the Great Lakes region. However, the presence of Small Arms and Light Weapons remains high and constitutes an ongoing threat to the stability and development of the country as a whole.

At present, MAG has four mobile destruction teams operating in the Third, Fifth, Sixth, and Seventh Military Regions (Equateur, Kasai Oriental, Katanga and Maniema provinces) and has trained a team of FARDC (Congolese Joint Forces) technicians to operate MAG's Regional Construction Centre at the Central Logistics Base in Kinshasa. 
Destruction activities were completed in the First Military Region (Bandundu) in March 2008, and will be completed in the Secondary Military Region (Bas-Congo) over the coming months. Work will also soon begin in Kasai Occidental. In addition to this, MAG has been asked to intervene urgently in the 8th Military Region (Nord Kivu) to destroy unsafely stored ammunition in order to prevent another accident such as Camp Ngashi.

In DRC, since May 2007, MAG has destroyed 70,000 weapons and over 150 tons of surplus ammunition previously held in Congolese Military stores.

Partnerships and Coordination 
Since the opening of a liaison office in Kinshasa in January 2005, MAG has become increasingly active in establishing partnerships with the international NGO community, as well as working with the local UN Mine Action Coordination Centre. MAG also cooperates with local NGOs in the field who are able to provide invaluable information regarding local mine/UXO problems. A partnership for organisational and technical capacity building has been signed until 2012 with Humanitas Ubangi, a local organisation working on MRE in the province of Equateur and hoping to extend to the Kasais. Additionally, MAG maintains a regular dialogue with relevant government and military authority and has entered into a partnership agreement through an MOU with a national NGO Humanitas Ubangi to develop its organisational and technical capacity to undertake Humanitarian Mine Action activities.

Iraq 
MAG has been conducting Humanitarian Mine Action in the heavily mine-affected north of the country since 1992, and since the most recent conflict efforts have concentrated on delivering vital services in northern and central areas of the country. This work significantly reduces the threat to both resident and transient populations, and has supported wider rehabilitation and socio-economic development initiatives. Up to date, MAG has cleared more than one and a half million landmines and items of UXO, freeing several million square metres of land for use by the local population. MAG's Iraq programme has recently also launched a dedicated project to safely remove and destroy small arms and light weapons, acting to support peace keeping initiatives which aim for long-term stability in Iraq.

Currently, MAG Iraq has more than 750 national staff working in the programme. This capacity consists of 18 Mine Action Teams, which provide a highly responsive and mobile multi-skilled clearance capacity, trained to International Mine Action Standards (IMAS); 10 Community Liaison teams; 2 midi-flail machines and operating teams; and 4 MDD teams. And despite security constraints, MAG remains operational in the North and parts of the centre and continues to implement operations. The programme works with local and regional partners in unstable parts of Iraq to reduce the threat posed by remnants of conflict to vulnerable high-risk communities.

Partnerships and Coordination 
MAG works with the National Mine Action Authority (NMAA) located in Baghdad, the Iraqi Kurdistan Mine Action Authority (IKMAA) and the General Directorate of Mine Action (GDMA) in the North. MAG also coordinates with UN agencies, local and regional government authorities and other organisations involved in humanitarian, rehabilitation and reconstruction initiatives throughout Iraq. As part of its commitment to national capacity building, MAG has been working in partnership with the Kurdish Ministries of Education and Health to develop a sustainable and independent Mine Risk Education (MRE) delivery capacity in Northern Iraq.

Laos 
MAG's Laotian programme began in 1994 with the establishment of the first internationally supported UXO (Unexploded Ordnance) clearance operation in the country. MAG currently works in XiangKhouang and Khammouane provinces, operating 11 UXO clearance teams (including two all-female teams) and 9 Community Liaison teams. The programme has 211 national staff, of which 35% are female.

MAG continued to pursue an integrated UXO action approach, which was subsequently developed and adopted nationally in 1996 with the creation of the Lao government’s national UXO organisation, UXO Lao. MAG has the distinction of having handed over to UXO Lao, two effective and efficient  operations in the provinces of Xieng Khouang and Saravan. Since 2000, MAG has continued to support the activities of UXO Lao, providing operational and technical advice to these provincial operations and MAG is also now providing technical assistance to UXO Lao in a third province: Khammouane. Recent sector reform has enabled international NGOs and Government of Lao (GoL) provincial authorities to ask MAG to assist with clearance linked to specific
development projects in XiangKhouang and Khammouane, especially in areas where UXO Lao is unable to respond. In addition, MAG has piloted the use of UXO detection dogs and Village Assisted Clearance (VAC) to improve productivity and impact.

In 2007 MAG Lao located and destroyed 6,460 items of UXO, 3,257,638 square metres of land was cleared for agriculture, drainage canals, electricity pylons, water wells, school gardens, roads (to provide access to markets) and for a project to promote tourism at the historic Plain of Jars. From January to June 2008, MAG Lao destroyed 3,537 items of UXO.

The work of MAG teams in Laos is the focus of the 2007 documentary movie Bomb Harvest. Additionally, MAG teams were featured in the 2017 documentary feature film Blood Road, winning a Shorty Award for social good with partnering with MAG and their demining efforts.

Community Liaison 
Almost 15 percent of field staff are members of Community Liaison teams, devoted to ensuring that communities are consulted and involved throughout the whole UXO clearance process. The information gained through Community Liaison ensures that UXO clearance is directly linked with poverty alleviation.

Lebanon 
 
MAG began its HMA activities in Southern Lebanon in 2000 and now employs 80 national staff members on new and existing projects. Following the 2006 ceasefire, this figure rose to around 360 nationally recruited employees. In 2003, MAG Lebanon completed a national Landmine Impact Survey (LIS), which was carried out in conjunction with the National Demining Office (NDO). Another team also conducted a technical survey into suspected contaminated areas along the 'Blue Line'.
During the conflict between Hezbollah and Israeli forces from mid-July to mid-August 2006, there was a dramatic change in the mine/unexploded ordnance (UXO) situation. The fighting and artillery bombardments were heaviest in southern Lebanon, and as a result, an estimated 915,000 internally displaced persons (IDPs)  fled this area and scattered throughout communities further north. Over 200,000 refugees left the country entirely. Roads and communities in southern Lebanon were littered with UXO thus making movement throughout South Lebanon both difficult and dangerous. Immediately prior to the conflict situation MAG deployed 4 MATs and 1 Mechanical team who went operational in June 2006. The flexibility of this MAT team meant that immediately after the cessation of violence MAG had a team on the ground responding to the most immediate threats. Since the immediate post-conflict phase, MAG has steadily worked on 'battle area clearance' (BAC), which concentrates on removing cluster submunitions and UXO.

From the end of 2006 conflict, MAG Lebanon's capacity grew to 22 Mine Action Teams (MATs), 5 Mechanical Teams, 2 Mine Dog Detection teams, 3 Community Liaison Teams (responsible for gathering information from the community on remnants of conflict), 1 Technical Survey Team, 1 Reconnaissance Team (responsible for surveying battle areas), and 1 Quality Control/ Quality Assurance Team (responsible for training and monitoring operations quality). Since the end of the 2006 conflict, MAG has cleared more than 9.8 million square metres of land, destroyed almost 21 000 remnants of conflict, cleared 294 dangerous areas, and assisted 450,000 people at risk from death or injury from remnants of conflict. The scope of activities carried out by MAG Lebanon's programme includes rapid survey and demarcation of landmine and UXO contaminated areas, clearance of priority routes and land, and explosive ordnance disposal (EOD) tasks. Alongside this, integration of MAG Lebanon's activities with those of the NDO (National Demining Office) and other organizations operating in the region remains a priority.

MAG has positive working relationships with key organisations such as the United Nations Mine Action Coordination Centre South Lebanon (MACC SL) and The Lebanese Red Cross.

Mali 
MAG is delivering Risk Education messages to internally displaced people, returnees and resident populations in northern Mali.

Myanmar 
MAG began work in Kayah state, Myanmar in 2014, giving lifesaving Mine Risk Education (MRE) to communities dependent for their livelihoods on land that is riddled with mines and unexploded ordnance (UXO) from decades of internal conflict.

Somalia 
Funded by the Office of Weapons Removal and Abatement, U.S. Department of State, MAG began its current operations in Somalia in May 2008 with a project to clear conventional weapons and stockpiles in conflict-affected areas in the Puntland region. Work is centred in the administrative capital of the region, Garowe, where a unit of the local police force is receiving Explosive Ordnance Disposal training – covering munitions recognition, the safe handling of explosive ordnance, conducting safe demolitions, first aid and communications. Once the training is complete, MAG will support and advise the team as they carry out operations around Puntland.

Following an accident in July 2008, concerning some children who were playing with a 106mm high explosive anti-tank round that exploded on a school football field (three died and six were injured), MAG held meetings with the elders of the town, made appeals for information, gave Mine Risk Education (MRE) on the local radio and collected other items reported by the community. It is anticipated that further small arms and light weapons (SALW) and UXO clearance of the country is required to remove these threats, to prevent further accidents and to ensure safe access and use of the land.

Partnerships and Coordination 
MAG carries out activities in Somalia in close coordination with the PMAC. MAG has also established a good relationship with UNDP Somalia who provide support to MAG’s current operation in Puntland. MAG is also working in cooperation with Geneva Call.

Sri Lanka 
MAG began emergency MRE, survey and demarcation activities in the Vanni region of northern Sri Lanka in February 2002. The aim of the MAG teams were to address the outstanding problems of landmine and UXO contamination apparent following the ceasefire (Memorandum of Understanding) between the Government of Sri Lanka and the Liberation Tigers of Tamil Eelam (LTTE). Through deploying Mine Risk Education (MRE), survey and demarcation assets in Northern Sri Lanka, MAG teams sought to protect those most affected by the conflict which had plagued the region since 1983. Later in 2002, clearance assets, including manual, mechanical and Explosive Ordnance Disposal (EOD) were introduced to the programme structure. 
  
In August 2003, MAG expanded into the eastern district of Batticaloa, where it remains, providing vital conflict recovery assistance. In May 2005, as a result of the December tsunami, MAG established a landmine and UXO response in Ampara district. MAG's capacity in Sri Lanka in its three project locations has grown to include five CL/MRE teams, three emergency EOD teams, nine technical survey/demining teams, one minefield marking/fencing team, two general survey teams
specifically tasked to support NGOs and local authorities undertaking development projects, one Battle Area Clearance (BAC) team and two MATs. In addition, MAG runs two Mechanical Support Units utilising Bozena mini flails.

Since the start of operations in 2002, MAG has cleared 15,500,000 square metres through manual, mechanical, and Battle Area Clearance (BAC) techniques.

In 2006 the security situation worsened between the Government and the TRO, forcing MAG to scale down its operations within Sri Lanka significantly, but restarted in September 2007 when MAG undertook tasking in Trincomalee district, responding to support the Ministry of Resettlements in their resettlement plans. All MAG assets returned to Batticola in October 2007 and since then MAG has concentrated on tasks only in the Batticaloa district due to a lack of access to the Northern region. At present, MAG fields one Community Liaison team, three Manual Mine Clearance Teams, and two Mechanical Ground Preparation Teams—each deploying a 'Bozena 4' mini flails.

MAG has already begun survey in an area of Mannar District in the north where the population had to leave quickly in late 2007 during fighting in the area. Five villages were surveyed in April 2009, and the area has been declared safe for the families to return. MAG now plans to expand its activities in the north throughout the remainder of the year in support of the initiative to return 80 per cent of IDPs back to their home areas by the end of 2009.

Mine Action in Sri Lanka is coordinated through the National Steering Committee for Mine Action (NSCMA) which is supported though by UNDP. MAG works in coordination with the NSCMA and also through district Mine Action Committees, where communication with all stakeholders allows contaminated areas to be prioritised for clearance and district work plans to be produced.

South Sudan 
MAG has been operational in South Sudan since 1998. At present, MAG has teams carrying out landmine clearance, bomb disposal and destruction of abandoned small arms and light weapons (SALW). MAG also have Community Liaison/Mine Risk Educational teams delivering important messages to settled populations, the internally displaced and returnees living in contaminated areas.

Vietnam 
As the largest non-military clearance organisation operating in Vietnam, MAG plays a key role in reducing the risk and impact of mines/UXO on the
local population, and also in facilitating community level post-clearance development and resettlement. MAG first began operating in Quảng Trị Province, central Vietnam, in 1999- encompassing the former DMZ (Vietnamese Demilitarized Zone), which divided Vietnam and witnessed the majority of flighting and bombing during the 1960s and '70s. In early 2003, MAG's operations were expanded to the adjacent province of Quảng Bình.

Most of MAG's work is mobile explosive ordnance disposal (EOD) operations, whereby teams systematically work through every village in a commune, clearing all known items of UXO and suspect items. From 1999 to the end of July 2008, MAG achieved the following outputs in Quảng Trị and Quảng Bình provinces:

Teams cleared 6,708,715 square metres of land using manual electronic and visual search techniques, removing 22,573 items of UXO and 2,040 mines.
Teams also visited 181,125 houses, performing 24,931 EOD tasks and removing 110,663 items of UXO and 439 mines.

Since November 2007, Community Liaison teams have conducted 324 community/partner meetings, visiting 255 villages, conducting 7,253 house to house surveys and documenting 962 mine/UXO reports.

MAG's work is closely linked to the development plans of the provinces, districts and communities in which it operates. The teams have cleared areas for a wide range of development activities and also respond to emergency EOD requests. MAG's current operational capacity in Vietnam consists of 5 MATs in Quảng Trị Province and 4 MATs in Quảng Bình Province and 4 recently introduced Community Liaison teams. In addition, MAG provides technical assistance and quality assurance to mine action projects in Thừa Thiên–Huế and Quảng Ngãi provinces.

MAG Vietnam also respond to emergency EOD requests. Humanitatian mine action is also linked to the development plans of the provinces, districts and communities. MAG Vietnam is committed to forming partnerships with government authorities at both national and local level, NGOs, and other agencies. To date, all projects have been either in partnership with the local authorities or with development organisations. MAG is a regular participant in the Landmine Working Group, a group of NGOs, UN agencies and other organisations concerned with the mine/UXO issue in Vietnam. In addition to this, MAG has developed working partnerships with poverty reduction agencies such as CHF-partners in rural development in order to link MAG Vietnam's clearance work to the Millennium Goal of poverty reduction. These partnerships ensure that land and villages cleared by MAG is used in the most productive and sustainable way, while meeting the needs of the local population.

Past operations

Afghanistan 
Ongoing since 2002: MAG trained the Organisation for Mine Clearance and Afghan Rehabilitation to address new types of UXO found after the coalition activity in the area. Mechanical assistance is also being provided.

Azerbaijan 
Training local partners in the Fizuli district close to the front line with areas still occupied by Armenian forces.

Burundi 
In 2007 MAG began assisting Burundi's government after civil war left the country with the burden of small arms and light weapons (SALW), and unsecured stockpiles.

Strained relations between the government and rebel groups have helped facilitate the spread of SALW throughout the civilian population. The situation has deteriorated further as a result of Burundi’s permeable frontiers and the inadequate enforcement of illegal arms trade legislation.

MAG works with Burundi's government to eliminate the threat of SALW and unsecured stockpiles. Their work in Burundi involves assisting the national army to destroy Man-Portable Air Defence Systems (MANPADS), and training and equipping members of the army and police force to become Mobile SALW destruction teams. These teams work throughout the country, destroying seized SALW, small arms ammunition (SAA) and explosives. When necessary the teams also respond to identified unexploded ordnance (UXO) spot tasks.

Cyprus 
Since October 2004, MAG has been contracted in Cyprus by the United Nations. They provide quality management for the work of commercial contractors, who clear minefields between the Greek Cypriot- and Turkish Cypriot-controlled regions of the country. Cyprus’s landmine contamination is estimated to span nine million square metres and consists of 77 minefields or suspected minefields.

MAG's work in Cyprus, based in Nicosia, safeguards the quality of work conducted by other UN contractors, and ensures that their work complies with international standards. Contractors must execute clearance work safely and efficiently, and MAG provides the management and maintenance of a mine detection dog accreditation and testing database.

Republic of Congo 
MAG started working in the Republic of Congo in late 2007, alongside the Ministry of Defence of the Republic of Congo, to try to prevent the risk from any remnants of conflict.

Its aims are to make a material contribution to peace-building initiatives and security efforts in the Republic of Congo through identifying, surveying and destroying small arms and light weapons, MANPADS (Man-Portable Air Defence Systems) and other explosive ordnance, which currently poses a hazard due to their degraded state, storage conditions and proximity to local communities.

Rwanda 
In August 2008, MAG, alongside the Regional Centre on Small Arms (RECSA), carried out a survey to determine the status of small arms and light weapons activities that were going on in Rwanda. As a result of this, they managed to get funding off the UK Government Conflict Prevention Pool to start a four-month Conventional Weapons Management and Disposal project. It includes assisting the Rwandan Army and Police, and also provides training, in stockpile management and destruction of surplus weapons, unstable ordnance and small arms ammunition. As a result of this over 10,000 weapons have already been destroyed.

MAG's work is beneficial for communities situated near stockpiles, as it reduces death and injury caused by them. It also benefits the wider population, who before MAG started this project, were threatened by the risk of violent crime that followed looting of the weapons that had been insecurely stored.

MAG have also trained army personnel in stockpile management, weapons destruction and basic Explosive Ordnance Disposal (EOD) skills to make up a Destruction Team, who then started weapons destruction activities which were supervised and supported by the MAG Technical Field Manager. After this a weapons destruction workshop was set up. This project ran up until March 2009, during which time MAG, along with the Rwandan Authorities, established some further priorities and decided what work was to be done from April 2009 onwards.

Somaliland 
October 2001 to July 2002: MAG worked with the United Nations Office for Project Services (UNOPS). Established and trained an EOD team composed of Somaliland police personnel and a member of the Somaliland Mine Action Centre (SMAC).

Assessments 
Assessments have been carried out in the following countries:
 Bosnia Herzegovina
 Colombia
 Congo-Brazzaville
 Eritrea
 Guinea-Bissau
 Ivory Coast
 Kashmir
 Namibia
 Senegal
 Taiwan
 Zambia

References

External links
 MAG website
 Official MAG film - Conflict Recovery
 Bomb Harvest, a film about MAG
 MAG photos from Quang Tri, Vietnam
 MAG photos from current operations worldwide.

Charities based in Manchester
International charities
Mine warfare and mine clearance organizations